Edvin Murati (born 12 November 1975) is an Albanian former professional footballer. He played for Panserraikos FC and Iraklis F.C. in Greece. He played also in France, Germany, and for the Albania national football team. In December 2018 he was honoured for his services to Albanian football, alongside Perlat Musta and Qamil Teliti.

International career
Murati made his debut for Albania in an August 1998 friendly match away against Cyprus and earned a total of 42 caps, scoring 4 goals. His final international was an October 2006 European Championship qualification match against the Netherlands. In the 2006 FIFA World Cup qualification, he scored a winning goal against UEFA Euro 2004 Champions Team Greece.

Career statistics

International

International goals

References

External links
 

1975 births
Living people
Footballers from Tirana
Albanian footballers
Association football midfielders
Albania international footballers
Paris Saint-Germain F.C. players
LB Châteauroux players
Stade Briochin players
Fortuna Düsseldorf players
Lille OSC players
Iraklis Thessaloniki F.C. players
Panserraikos F.C. players
Ligue 1 players
Ligue 2 players
2. Bundesliga players
Super League Greece players
Albanian expatriate footballers
Expatriate footballers in France
Expatriate footballers in Germany
Expatriate footballers in Greece
Albanian expatriate sportspeople in France
Albanian expatriate sportspeople in Germany
Albanian expatriate sportspeople in Greece